Eloi F. X. Dugas (died 1902) was a Louisiana politician.

Dugas was raised Roman Catholic; having, with his wife, donated the bell and tower located outside of St. Elizabeth Catholic Church in Paincourtville.  After the war he lived a very active life, in both business and politics.  He was president, respectively, of the Bank of Napoleonville and of the Pioneer Printing Co. He also served as a member of the Louisiana House of Representatives and later as a member of the Louisiana State Senate. He "accomplished gratifying results in the advancement and upbuilding of that portion of Louisiana in which his life work was cast".

References

1902 deaths
Date of birth missing
Members of the Louisiana House of Representatives
Louisiana state senators